Tor Erik Torske (born 14 July 1983) is a Norwegian football player currently playing as a striker for Sunndal.

After one Eliteserien season with Kristiansund his contract was not renewed and he returned to his former club Sunndal.

Career statistics

References

1983 births
Living people
People from Molde
People from Sunndal
Norwegian footballers
Norwegian First Division players
Kristiansund BK players
Eliteserien players
Association football forwards
Sportspeople from Møre og Romsdal